A 20th-century system of plant taxonomy, the Judd system (1999-2016) of plant classification was drawn up by the American botanist Walter S. Judd (1951-) and collaborators, partially based on APG schemes.

2016 system 
 viridophytes (green plants)
 chlorophytes
 streptophytes
 streptophyte green algae
 embryophytes (land plants)
 bryophytes
 liverworts
 mosses
 hornworts
 tracheophytes (vascular plants)
 lycophytes
 Lycopodiales
 euphyllophytes
 monilophytes (ferns)
 Equisetales
 Psilotales
 Ophioglossales
 leptosporangiate ferns
 Osmundales
 Salviniales
 Cyatheales
 Polypodiales
 eupolypods I
 eupolypods II
 spermatophytes (seed plants)
 gymnosperms
 Cycadales (cycads) 
 Ginkgoales 
 Coniferales (conifers) 
 Gnetales
 angiosperms
 ANA grade
 Mesangiospermae
 magnoliid clade (Magnoliidae)
 Ceratophyllales
 monocots (Monocotyledoneae)
 eudicots (tricolpates; Eudicotyledoneae)

Bibliography  
 Judd, W., Campbell, C., Kellog, E., Stevens, P. (1999). Plant systematics: a phylogenetic approach. Sinauer Associates.
 Judd, W., Campbell, C., Kellog, E., Stevens, P. (2002). Plant systematics: a phylogenetic approach. 2nd ed. Sinauer Associates.
 Judd, W., Campbell, C., Kellog, E., Stevens, P., Donoghue, M. (2002). Plant systematics: a phylogenetic approach. 3rd ed. Sinauer Associates. . Google Books.
 Judd, W., Campbell, C., Kellog, E., Stevens, P., Donoghue, M. (2016). Plant systematics: a phylogenetic approach. 4th ed. Sinauer Associates. . Sinauer website.

system, Judd